StudioCanal Limited, operating as StudioCanal (formerly Optimum Releasing), is the official branch of StudioCanal in the British Isles. The company releases many films, including foreign, anime (mostly Studio Ghibli), independent, art, British, Irish and American films in the United Kingdom and sometimes Ireland.

History

Optimum Releasing (1999–2011)
The company was founded in October 1998, and began operation as Optimum Releasing in May 1999. The company, at the time, was exclusively a theatrical distributor, holding distribution of new releases and UK rights to the back catalogues of other companies. Optimum's first theatrical release was a restored version of The Third Man, licensed from Le Studio Canal+, and was released in July of that year, on the same weekend as the anticipated UK release of Star Wars: Episode I – The Phantom Menace.

The company launched a Home Entertainment division in 2004, and released material under several strands:

 Optimum Home Entertainment (standard banner for DVD and Blu-Ray releases)
 Optimum Classic (Re-releases of back catalogue films)
 Optimum World (world cinema releases)
 Optimum Asia (Asian films, including Japanese Anime)

Optimum released over two hundred films a year and were one of the most prominent distributors in the independent film and world cinema market in the United Kingdom since the closure of Tartan Films in June 2008. On 4 May 2006, Optimum Releasing was acquired by French film producer and distributor StudioCanal, a subsidiary of Vivendi's Canal+ Group, for £22-£25 Million, thus marking StudioCanal's first entry into an international market. Since then, StudioCanal now distributes their back classic British film catalogue which includes many from their libraries of Carolco Pictures and EMI Films, through Optimum Releasing under the Optimum Classic collection strand.

Some of the last titles released under the Optimum Releasing name include Kill List, The Guard, and a re release of Whisky Galore!.

StudioCanal UK (2011–present)
In September 2011, Optimum Releasing was rebranded under the StudioCanal name. Tinker Tailor Soldier Spy, Tyrannosaur, Don't Be Afraid of the Dark, The Awakening, and W.E. were among the first films released under the new name.

StudioCanal UK are currently in the works of the upcoming biopic Back To Black, based on the life and career of late singer-songwriter Amy Winehouse, with director Sam Taylor-Johnson who did Fifty Shades Of Grey. The film is scheduled to be released for 2024.

References

External links

Official history (archived); current version
List of film credits from Internet Movie Database

Film distributors of the United Kingdom
StudioCanal
Mass media companies established in 1998
Mass media companies of the United Kingdom
1998 establishments in the United Kingdom